Eberhard Kulenkampff (10 December 1927 – 6 September 2021) was a German-Namibian architect, city planner and artist. He was a director of the Senate of Bremen from 1974 to 1987.

Life and work
He was born in  Southwest Africa to a Bremen merchant family. In World War II, he was a soldier from 1944-45 and severely wounded. He studied architecture and city planning at the  University of Hanover from 1948 to 1954 and was a member of the Social Democratic Party of Germany. Kulenkampff died in Bremen on 6 September 2021, at the age of  93.

Bibliography 
 Jürgen Fränzel: Senator in Bremen Hans Stefan Seifritz. Ein Lebenslauf. Mit Beiträgen von Margot Walther und Eberhard Kulenkampff. Hauschild, Bremen 1987, .
 "Nehmen wir doch die Sterne!" INTERVIEW: 51 Jahre Planetenviertel Garbsen, in: moderneREGIONAL 16,3.
 Jutta Grätz: „Wir entwarfen Straßennamen aus der Sternkarte.“ Interview mit Eberhard Kulenkampff, dem Leiter der Planungsgruppe, die den späteren Stadtteil Auf der Horst entwarf. in: Der Griff nach den Sternen: Geschichte und Gegenwart des Garbsener Stadtteils Auf der Horst, published by Axel Priebs und Rose Scholl, Münster: LIT Verlag, 2016, ; Table of Contents (in German)

Sources 
 Karl Marten Barfuß, Hartmut Müller, Daniel Tilgner (publisher): Geschichte der Freien Hansestadt Bremen von 1945 bis 2005. Band 2: 1970–1989. Edition Temmen, Bremen 2008, .

References

1927 births
2021 deaths
German architects
German artists
Namibian architects
Namibian artists
Namibian people of German descent
Social Democratic Party of Germany politicians
University of Hanover alumni
Architects from Bremen
Artists from Bremen